Scopula nacida is a moth of the family Geometridae. It was described by Paul Dognin in 1901. It is found in Ecuador and Peru.

Subspecies
It has two subspecies:

Scopula nacida nacida (Ecuador)
Scopula nacida cinerosaria (Warren, 1904) (Peru)

References

Moths described in 1901
nacida
Moths of South America
Taxa named by Paul Dognin